A list of British films released in 2000:

See also
 2000 in film
 2000 in British music
 2000 in British radio
 2000 in British television
 2000 in the United Kingdom
 List of 2000 box office number-one films in the United Kingdom

References

External links

2000
Films
Lists of 2000 films by country or language